Hypotheses non fingo (Latin for "I frame no hypotheses", or "I contrive no hypotheses") is a phrase used by Isaac Newton in an essay, "General Scholium", which was appended to the second (1713) edition of the Principia.

Original remark
A 1999 translation of the Principia presents Newton's remark as follows:

Later commentary
The 19th-century philosopher of science William Whewell qualified this statement, saying that, "it was by such a use of hypotheses, that both Newton himself and Kepler, on whose discoveries those of Newton were based, made their discoveries". Whewell stated:What is requisite is, that the hypothesis should be close to the facts, and not connected with them by other arbitrary and untried facts; and that the philosopher should be ready to resign it as soon as the facts refuse to confirm it.

Later, Imre Lakatos asserted that such a resignation should not be too rushed.

See also
 Action at a distance
 Primum movens

References

Latin philosophical phrases
Gravity
Isaac Newton
History of physics
Philosophy of science
Razors (philosophy)
Epistemology